Maria Fernanda Alves and Jessica Moore were the defending champions, having won the event in 2012, but they lost in the quarterfinals to Jan Abaza and Louisa Chirico.

Julia Cohen and Tatjana Maria, originally seeded second, withdrew before the tournament began and were not replaced. As a result, their opponents Shelby Rogers and Nicola Slater were given a bye into the second round.

Abaza and Chirico won the tournament, defeating Asia Muhammad and Allie Will in the final, 6–4, 6–4.

Seeds

Draw

References 
 Draw

Audi Melbourne Pro Tennis Classic - Doubles